Rocky Mount–Wilson Regional Airport  is a public airport located seven miles (11 km) southwest of the central business district of Rocky Mount, a city located in Nash and Edgecombe Counties in the U.S. state of North Carolina. It is also north of Wilson, a city in Wilson County. The airport is owned by the Rocky Mount–Wilson Airport Authority.

History 
Piedmont Airlines served RWI from 1961 to 1980. CCAir, operating as US Airways Express, later provided scheduled service to RWI, but traffic fell after the arrival of Southwest Airlines at nearby Raleigh-Durham International Airport (RDU) in 1999, which made flights from RDU relatively inexpensive. The US Airways Express service was suspended in March 2001 and replaced with shuttle bus service to RDU.

Facilities and aircraft

For the 12-month period ending July 31, 2005, the airport had 24,904 aircraft operations, an average of 68 per day: 93% general aviation, 6% air taxi, 1% military and <1% scheduled commercial. There are 23 aircraft based at this airport: 16 single engine, 6 multi-engine and 1 jet.

References

External links 
  at North Carolina DOT airport guide
 

Airports in North Carolina
Transportation in Nash County, North Carolina
Buildings and structures in Nash County, North Carolina